Raymond Maurice Lee (born 19 September 1970) is a former English footballer who played as a right winger.

Career
In 1986, Lee joined Arsenal as an apprentice. Lee spent four years at Arsenal, before being released in 1990. Following a stint with Swindon Town, where he failed to make an appearance, Lee signed for Scarborough. During the 1990–91 season, Lee made 10 Fourth Division appearances for Scarborough, before moving to Redbridge Forest. In 1991, Lee joined Chelmsford City, making 26 appearances, scoring once.

References

1970 births
Living people
Association football midfielders
English footballers
Footballers from Bristol
Black British sportsmen
Arsenal F.C. players
Swindon Town F.C. players
Scarborough F.C. players
Redbridge Forest F.C. players
Chelmsford City F.C. players
English Football League players
Southern Football League players